Kwon Soo-hyun (born August 18, 1986) is a South Korean actor. Three years into his acting career, Kwon finally got cast in the television series Run, Jang-mi (2014), playing a vital part in the drama. He also starred in High Society (2015). He has stated that he looks up to Park Hae-il as his role model.

Filmography

Film

Television series

Awards

References

External links 

 
 

 Fancafe:Eternal Soohyunshine  (in Korean)

1986 births
Living people
South Korean male television actors
South Korean male film actors